Vadim N. Gladyshev is a professor of medicine at Brigham and Women's Hospital, Harvard Medical School, who specializes in antioxidant biology. He is known for his characterization of the human selenoproteome. He has conducted studies on whether organisms can acquire cellular damage from their food; the role selenium plays as a micro-nutrient with significant health benefits;  In 2013 he won the NIH Pioneer Award.

In 2021, he was elected member of the U. S. National Academy of Sciences.

References 

American biologists
Living people
Harvard Medical School faculty
Year of birth missing (living people)
Members of the United States National Academy of Sciences